The Institution of Incorporated Engineers, Sri Lanka (IIESL) was established in 1977 and incorporated by a Sri Lankan Act of Parliament. The institute registers engineering technologists and Incorporated Engineers under the Sydney Accord.

History
Formed as the All Ceylon Engineering Diplomates Association in 1977, the society in 1992 changed to the Institute of Engineering Diplomates, Sri Lanka by an Act of Parliament, Act No 64 of 1992, registering all Engineering Diplomates. In 2000, it changed once again to Institution of Incorporated Engineers, Sri Lanka by an Act of Parliament, Act No 11 of 2000.

Membership
Hon. FIIE(SL) - Fellow of Institution of Incorporated Engineers, Sri Lanka
FIIE(SL) - Fellow of Institution of Incorporated Engineers, Sri Lanka
MIIE(SL) - Member of Institution of Incorporated Engineers, Sri Lanka  
AMIIE(SL) - Associate Member of Institution of Incorporated Engineers, Sri Lanka
Student members

The following courses are entitled to membership:
Higher National Diploma in Engineering (HNDE) - Sri Lanka Institute of Advanced Technological Education
National Diploma in Technology (NDT) - Institute of Technology, University of Moratuwa
National Diploma in Engineering Science (NDES) - Institute of Engineering Technology, Sri Lanka
Diploma in Technology - Open University of Sri Lanka

See also
Engineering Council, Sri Lanka
Institution of Engineers, Sri Lanka

References

External links
IIE website
IIESL Membership

Engineering societies based in Sri Lanka
Organizations established in 1977